Holly Meade (b. Winchester, Massachusetts, September 14, 1956 - d. June 28, 2013) was an American artist best known for her woodblock prints and for her illustrations for children's picture books.

Meade's illustrations for Hush!: A Thai Lullaby (1996, Orchard Books,) by Minfong Ho won a 1997 Caldecott Honor for illustration.

John Willy and Freddy McGee (Marshall Cavendish, 1998,) which Meade both wrote and illustrated, was an honoree for the Charlotte Zolotow Award for Creative Writing.

Biography
Meade was the daughter of Russell and Joanne Meade of Winchester, Massachusetts. She earned her A.B. from the Rhode Island School of Design in 1978. She lived in Sedgwick, Maine and had 2 children, Jenny and Noah Smick.

Career
Meade worked in "drawing, collage, printmaking, basket making, and fabric design." In 1992, she illustrated her first of many children's picture books, an endeavor that she called "the other focus of my work life". She began to work in woodblock printing in 2002, following a workshop with printmaker Hester Stinnett at the Haystack Mountain School. Some of her prints are in the permanent collection of the Portland Museum of Art.

Woodblock prints illustrate some of her later picture books, including David Elliott’s series that includes On the Farm (Candlewick, 2008), In the Wild (2010) and In the Sea (2012).

Children's books
She used torn paper to illustrate the 1997 book Cocoa Ice, which was given a Lupine Award by the Maine Library Association. Meade describe the challenge of illustrating the parallel story with, "pictures where a tropical place and warm palette must go hand in hand with a bare landscape and cool palette."

Her book John Willy and Freddy McGee was a 1999 Charlotte Zolotow Award Honor Book.

Selected Bibliography 
The follow is a selection of some of the works Meade published.

Author and Illustrator 
2001 A Place to Sleep

2001 The Rabbit's Bride by the Brother's Grimm

2003 John Willy and Freddy McGee 

2005 Inside, Inside, Inside

Illustrator 
1996 Hush!: A Thai Lullaby by Minfong Ho

1997 Cocoa Ice by Diana Appelbaum

2004 Blue Bowl Down by C. M. Millen

2004 Peek!: A Thai Hide-and-Seek by Minfong Ho

2005 Hop! by Phyllis Root

2005 Quack! by Phyllis Root

2005 Rata-Pata-Scata-Fata: A Caribbean Story by Phillis Gershator

2007 Sky Sweeper by Phillis Gershator

2007 Virginnie's Hat by Dori Chacaonas

2008 On the Farm by David Elliott

References

External links

 She-Bear Gallery

1956 births
American children's writers
American illustrators
People from Winchester, Massachusetts
Rhode Island School of Design alumni
2013 deaths
People from Sedgwick, Maine
American children's book illustrators
20th-century American artists